Building at 23–27 S. Sixth Street is a historic commercial building located at Terre Haute, Vigo County, Indiana. It was built in 1882, and is a two-story, rectangular, Italianate style brick building.  It features a cast iron storefront on the first story, tall, narrow segmental arched windows on the second, and a projecting cornice. It was renovated in 1975.

It was listed on the National Register of Historic Places in 1983.

References

Commercial buildings on the National Register of Historic Places in Indiana
Italianate architecture in Indiana
Commercial buildings completed in 1882
Buildings and structures in Terre Haute, Indiana
National Register of Historic Places in Terre Haute, Indiana